The Jameh Mosque of Gugan is related to the Qajar dynasty and is located in the Azarshahr County, Gugan District, in the city of Gugan, on the square of namaz.

References

Mosques in Iran
Mosque buildings with domes
National works of Iran